Seppo Nikkari (6 February 1948 – 18 April 2022) was a Finnish long-distance runner. He competed in the marathon at the 1972 Summer Olympics.

References

External links
 

1948 births
2022 deaths
Athletes (track and field) at the 1972 Summer Olympics
Finnish male long-distance runners
Finnish male marathon runners
Olympic athletes of Finland
People from Pomarkku
Sportspeople from Satakunta